The United States competed at the 1988 Winter Paralympics in Innsbruck, Austria. 45 competitors from the United States won 7 gold medals, 17 silver medal and 6 bronze medal and finished 6th in the medal table.

Alpine skiing 

The medalists are:

  Dan Ashbaugh, Men's Downhill LW1
  Dan Ashbaugh, Men's Giant Slalom LW1
  Dan Ashbaugh, Men's Slalom LW1
  Paul Dibello, Men's Giant Slalom LW3
  Diana Golden, Women's Downhill LW2
  Diana Golden, Women's Giant Slalom LW2
  Lana Jo Chapin, Women's Downhill LW4
  Lana Jo Chapin, Women's Giant Slalom LW4
  Cara Dunne, Women's Downhill B1
  Cara Dunne, Women's Giant Slalom B1
  Mark Godfrey, Men's Downhill LW1
  Mark Godfrey, Men's Giant Slalom LW1
  Mark Godfrey, Men's Slalom LW1
  Nancy Gustafson, Women's Downhill LW6/8
  Marilyn Hamilton, Women's Giant Slalom LW10
  Martha Hill, Women's Downhill LW2
  Martha Hill, Women's Slalom LW2
  David Jamison, Men's Slalom LW2
  Greg Mannino, Men's Downhill LW2
  Greg Mannino, Men's Giant Slalom LW2
  Kathy Pitcher, Women's Giant Slalom LW6/8
  Kip Roth, Men's Downhill LW5/7
  Kip Roth, Men's Slalom LW5/7
  Don Garcia, Men's Slalom LW9
  Rik Heid, Men's Downhill LW4
  Rik Heid, Men's Slalom LW4
  Robert Stroshine, Men's Downhill LW9
  Robert Stroshine, Men's Giant Slalom LW9

Biathlon 

Four athletes competed in two events in biathlon: Tom Gall, William Henry, Richard Riley and Reed Robinson. No medals were won.

Cross-country 

The medalists are:

  Robert Walsh, Men's Short Distance 15 km B3
  Joe Walsh, Men's Long Distance 30 km B3

See also 

 United States at the Paralympics
 United States at the 1988 Winter Olympics

References 

1988
1988 in American sports
Nations at the 1988 Winter Paralympics